San José de Maipo is the name of a commune in Chile and the city within it, located in the Cajón del Maipo, in Cordillera Province, Santiago Metropolitan Region, some 48 kilometers south-east of capital Santiago, bordered on the east by Argentina, across the Andes.

Demographics
Of these, 9,311 (69.6%) lived in urban areas and 4,065 (30.4%) in rural areas. The population grew by 14.9% (1,730 persons) between the 1992 and 2002 censuses. Its population density was then , making it the most sparsely populated commune in the region.

Economy
Among the present economic activities mining stands out, including the exploitation of stone quarries, the production of local products such as almonds and nuts, craftsmanship of different rock types, among others. Regional tourism is very important in this zone, as there are a great number of food and lodging establishments. In 2001 the commune was declared a National Tourism Interest Zone (Zona de Interés Turístico Nacional), by the National Service of Tourism (SERNATUR).

History 
San Jose de Maipo was named a town by order of Ambrosio O'Higgins in 1792. The Governor of Chile and future Viceroy of Peru considered it necessary to give it the power of a town to better support mining that took place around San Pedro Nolasco.

During the 19th century the area was the scene of several important events in the independence of Chile, since because of its proximity to Argentina the area was used by General San Martin and the liberating Army of the Andes to support the Bernardine cause of O'Higgins.

At the end of that century mining began in the area. During the 20th Century, the commune became very important for the city of Santiago, since the first hydroelectric power station of the zone was constructed there (Maitenes), and also an aqueduct was constructed that supplies potable water to the city from Andean glaciers. Because of the purity of its air, sanatoriums were built for respiratory patients from all over Chile. Towards the end of the century ecotourism became a pole of development, thanks to the Maipo river's suitability for rafting.

Administration
As a commune, San José de Maipo is a third-level administrative division of Chile administered by a municipal council headed by an alcalde who is directly elected every four years. For the years 2012-2016 the mayor is Luis Pezoa Álvarez (RN), and the council members are:
 Maite Birke Abaroa (PRI)
 Andrés Venegas Veliz (PRSD)
 Marco Quintanilla Pizarro (PS)
 Andy Ortiz Apablaza (IND)
 Eduardo Astorga Flores (RN)
 Carmen Larenas Whipple (RN)

Within the electoral divisions of Chile, San José de Maipo is represented in the Chamber of Deputies of the National Congress of Chile by Osvaldo Andrade (PS) and Leopoldo Pérez (RN) as part of the 29th electoral district, (together with Puente Alto, Pirque and La Pintana). The commune is represented in the Senate by Soledad Alvear (PDC) and Pablo Longueira (UDI) as part of the 8th senatorial constituency (Santiago-East).

References

External links

 Municipality of San José de Maipo

Communes of Chile
Populated places in Cordillera Province
1792 establishments in the Spanish Empire